The Jimmy Dean Show is an hour-long weekly music and variety television show carried by ABC for three seasons from September 19, 1963 to April 1, 1966 out of ABC Studio One in New York. Its first season was written by Peppiatt and Aylesworth, and the show starred Jimmy Dean.

Series overview

Season 1 (1963–64)

Season 2 (1964-65)

Season 3 (1965-66)

References

Lists of American non-fiction television series episodes
Lists of variety television series episodes